Neal Joseph Schon (born February 27, 1954) is an American rock guitarist, songwriter, and vocalist, best known as the founder and lead guitarist for the band Journey. He is the sole original member to remain throughout the group's history. He was a member of the rock band Santana before forming Journey, was a member for the group Bad English during Journey's hiatus from 1987-1995 and was also an original member of Hardline.

Schon was inducted into the Oklahoma Music Hall of Fame on August 23, 2013, and into the Rock and Roll Hall of Fame as a member of Journey on April 7, 2017.

Early life and career
Neal George Joseph Schon was born at Tinker Air Force Base, Oklahoma, the son of Matthew and Barbara Schon. He is of German and Italian ancestry. His father was a big band musician, arranger, and composer, and played and taught all reed instruments with emphasis on jazz tenor saxophone; his mother was a big band singer. Schon started playing guitar at age 10. He attended Aragon High School in San Mateo, California, later dropping out to pursue his music career.

A quick learner, he joined Santana at age 17, in 1971. Schon has said he was asked by Eric Clapton to join Derek and the Dominos, but that he joined Santana instead, performing on the albums Santana III and Caravanserai. According to Bobby Whitlock,
 

Schon also played in the band Azteca. In 1973, he, Gregg Rolie and manager Herbie Herbert co-founded the Golden Gate Rhythm Section, which had later been re-named to Journey after a suggestion by roadie John Villaneuva.

Schon's guitar style is influenced by guitarists such as B.B. King, Albert King, Robert Johnson, Muddy Waters, John Lee Hooker, Jeff Beck, Eric Clapton, Carlos Santana, Jimmy Page and Jimmy Green.

In addition to several solo albums and his work with Journey, Schon's work also includes: a pair of albums with keyboardist Jan Hammer, short-term collaborations with Sammy Hagar (HSAS and Planet Us) and Paul Rodgers, stints with Bad English (a supergroup that featured Journey's Jonathan Cain and Deen Castronovo and Cain's former Babys bandmates John Waite and Ricky Phillips) and Hardline (which also featured Castronovo).  Even as Journey's latest lineup plays to a still-faithful body of fans, Schon has immersed himself in side projects such as Piranha Blues (1999); "Black Soup Cracker", a funk outfit that features former Prince associates Rosie Gaines and Michael Bland; and Soul SirkUS with Jeff Scott Soto.

Schon can be heard on other albums including three tracks on Michael Bolton's The Hunger, with the Schon sound most recognizable on "(Sittin' On) The Dock of the Bay".  He also joined Larry Graham to play in an all-star band for cult funk artist and ex-wife of Miles Davis, Betty Davis.  In addition, Schon (along with then Journey manager Herbie Herbert) also contributed to Lenny White's 1977 album Big City, specifically the instrumental jam "And We Meet Again".

On February 9, 2018, Schon played a charity show at San Francisco's The Independent, benefiting North Bay Fire Relief. The group recruited featured former Journey drummer Deen Castronovo (who also sang some of the vocals), former Journey keyboardist Gregg Rolie and bassist Marco Mendoza of The Dead Daisies.

In 2019, Schon announced a tour to be called Neal Schon's Journey Through Time. The tour was slated to feature Castronovo, Rolie and Mendoza.

He played the Star Spangled Banner on electric guitar for the opening game of the 2022 NBA finals.

Guitars
Schon's first guitar was an acoustic Stella, followed two years later by a Gibson ES-335. When the 335 was stolen, he replaced it with a '56 Les Paul Goldtop reissue that he used for many years. Schon has used Gibson guitars over the years, having also used Fender and Ovation guitars during Journey's Departure tour. He had a limited edition signature Les Paul model called the Neal Schon Signature Model Custom Les Paul, of which Gibson made only 35, according to the Gibson Custom website (80 according to Neal Schon's website). He has previously employed Godin guitars on his 1995 solo album Beyond the Thunder, and more recently uses Paul Reed Smith guitars. In the late 1980s, Schon manufactured (through Jackson Guitars and later Larrivee) and played his own line of guitars. Simply named Schon, about 200 of the Jackson-produced models were made.

As of 2008, Schon currently prefers guitar pedals from Xotic, a Vox Satriani model and occasionally uses a Buddy Guy wah pedal.

Personal life

In September 2011, Schon publicly confirmed he was in a relationship with Michaele Salahi. The two said they had dated years previously in the 1990s and were very happy together.

On October 14, 2012, Schon proposed to Salahi onstage during a charity concert at the Lyric Opera House in Baltimore, Maryland, offering her an oval 11.42 carat diamond engagement ring.

The couple married on December 15, 2013 in a live broadcast wedding that was held in the Palace of Fine Arts in San Francisco, California. The marriage is Schon's fifth and Salahi's second.

Schon has confirmed that he has tinnitus, a constant ringing in the ears, common in musicians who have toured extensively.

Discography

Solo albums
 Late Nite (1989)
 Beyond the Thunder (1995)
 Electric World (1997)
 Piranha Blues (1999)
 Voice (2001)
 I on U (2005)
 The Calling (2012)
 So U (2014)
 Vortex (2015)
 Universe (2020)

with Santana
 Santana III (1971)
 Caravanserai (1972)
 Santana IV (2016)

with Azteca
 Azteca (1972)
 Pyramid of the Moon (1973)

with Journey
 Journey (1975)
 Look into the Future (1976)
 Next (1977)
 Infinity (1978)
 Evolution (1979)
 Departure (1980)
 Dream, After Dream (1980, Japanese movie soundtrack)
 Escape (1981)
 Frontiers (1983)
 Raised on Radio (1986)
 Trial by Fire (1996)
 Arrival (2001)
 Generations (2005)
 Revelation (2008)
 Eclipse (2011) 
 Freedom (2022)

with Jan Hammer
 Untold Passion (1981)
 Here to Stay (1982)

with HSAS
 Through the Fire (1984)

with Bad English
 Bad English (1989)
 Backlash (1991)

with Hardline
 Hot Cherie EP (1992)
 Double Eclipse (1992)
 Can't Find My Way EP (1992)
 II (2002)

with Paul Rodgers
 Muddy Water Blues: A Tribute to Muddy Waters (1993)
 The Hendrix Set (1993)
 Now (1997; co-writer of "Saving Grace")
 Paul Rodgers & Friends Live at Montreux 1994 (2011)

with Just·If·I
 All One People (1991)

with Abraxas Pool
 Abraxas Pool (1997)

with Soul SirkUS
 World Play (2004)

Guest appearances
 Betty Davis – Betty Davis (1973)
 Robert Fleischman - Perfect Stranger (1979)
 Sammy Hagar - Danger Zone (1980)
 Tané Cain - Tané Cain (1983)
 Silver Condor - Trouble at Home (1983)
 Hear 'n Aid - Stars (1985)
 Gregg Rolie - Gregg Rolie (1985)
 Eric Martin - Eric Martin (1985; co-writer of "Just One Night")
 Joe Cocker - Cocker (1986)
 Gregg Rolie - Gringo (1987)
 Michael Bolton - The Hunger (1987)
 Jimmy Barnes  - Freight Train Heart (1987)
 Glen Burtnick (ex Styx) - Heroes and Zeroes (1987)
 The Allman Brothers Band - Where It All Begins (1994; co-writer of "Temptation Is a Gun")
 Frederiksen/Phillips - Frederiksen/Phillips (1995)
 Fergie Frederiksen – Equilibrium (1999)
 Carmine Appice - Guitar Zeus - Safe (1996)
 Various artists - Merry Axemas, Vol. 2: More Guitars for Christmas (1998)
 Trichromes - Trichromes (2002)
 Jeff Scott Soto - Lost in the Translation (2004)
 Mickey Thomas - Over the Edge (2004)
 Beth Hart - "Les Paul & Friends: American Made World Played" (2005)
 Radioactive - Taken (2005)
 Sammy Hagar - Cosmic Universal Fashion (2008)
 Gary Schutt - Loss 4 Words (2008; guitar solo on "Road Trip")
 Lee Ritenour - Lee Ritenour's 6 String Theory (2010)
 Two Fires - Burning Bright (2011; co-writer of "Some Things Are Better Left Unsaid")
 Eric Martin - Mr. Rock Vocalist (2012)
 Sammy Hagar - Sammy Hagar & Friends (2013)
 Jimmy Barnes - 30:30 Hindsight (2014)
 Revolution Saints - Revolution Saints (2015)
 Jason Becker - Triumphant Hearts (2018)
 Steve Augeri - Seven Ways 'til Sunday (2022; co-writer of "Desert Moon")

References

Sources

External links
 Neal Schon Official Site
 Neal Schon Official FaceBook Page
 Neal Schon Official YouTube Channel
 Neal Schon Biography
 
 
 

1954 births
American rock guitarists
American male guitarists
Bad English members
Hagar Schon Aaronson Shrieve members
Hardline (band) members
Journey (band) members
Lead guitarists
Living people
American people of German descent
American people of Italian descent
Musicians from Oklahoma City
Planet Us members
Santana (band) members
Soul SirkUS members
American heavy metal guitarists
Guitarists from Oklahoma
20th-century American guitarists
Favored Nations artists
Frontiers Records artists
Shrapnel Records artists
Columbia Records artists
People from San Mateo, California
Glam metal musicians